Srdjan Slagalo (born 8 July 1966 in Bosnia and Herzegovina) is a Bosnian retired footballer.

Club career
After playing for his local side, FK UNIS Vogošća,  Slagalo earned a move to FK Sarajevo, the most successful team in Bosnia and Herzegovina.

Because of the Bosnian War, Slagalo left his family and girlfriend, who he never saw again, to play for Atlético Clube de Portugal in the Portuguese lower leagues in 1992.

References

External links
 Srdjan Slagalo at ForaDeJogo.net

1966 births
Living people
Association football defenders
Yugoslav footballers
Bosnia and Herzegovina footballers
Atlético Clube de Portugal players
S.C. Espinho players
Varzim S.C. players
Leça F.C. players
F.C. Famalicão players
A.D. Esposende players
Liga Portugal 2 players
Bosnia and Herzegovina expatriate footballers
Expatriate footballers in Portugal
Bosnia and Herzegovina expatriate sportspeople in Portugal